Quintus Marcius Barea Soranus was a Roman senator who lived in the first half of the first century AD.

Life
He was a member of the gens Marcia, which claimed descent from Ancus Marcius, the third king of Rome.

He was suffect consul in 34 with Titus Rustius Nummius Gallus, and proconsul of Africa from 41 to 43.

An inscription found in Hippo Regius provides information about Soranus. His filiation in this inscription attests that his father's praenomen was Gaius. Soranus was one of the quindecimviri sacris faciundis, the collegium of Roman priests entrusted with the care of the Sibylline oracles, as well as having been appointed a fetial.

Other inscriptions recovered from the former province attest to his influence there: Soranus enfranchised a number of Africans, who afterwards used his gentilicium "Marcius" as their own.

Family 
Soranus is known to have two sons: Quintus Marcius Barea Soranus, suffect consul of 52; and Quintus Marcius Barea Sura, the grandfather of Trajan.

References 

Senators of the Roman Empire
Suffect consuls of Imperial Rome
Roman governors of Africa
1st-century Romans
Barea Soranus